Pachyphytum bracteosum, the large-bracted pachyphytum, is a perennial succulent native to Mexico, occurring on rocks at altitudes between . The succulent has a diploid number of 66 or 132. The closest relatives of the plant are Pachyphytum oviferum and Pachyphytum longifolium.

Description

Pachyphytum bracteosum is a leafy and fleshy succulent. Fallen leaves form circular leaf scars low on the stem. The purplish or bluish green leaves are thick and flattened. Lower leaves grow at a right angle to the stem; upper leaves are erect or curved. The flowering stem is curved at the apex and is secund. The numerous bracts are arranged in two imbricated rows and have short pedicels. The five sepals are unequal, with two long obtuse, lateral sepals and three other shorter sepals. The five stamens that alternate with the petals are free from the corolla while the other five are borne on the petals. The five erect carpels each have a broad scale at their base. The anthers are ovate, the styles are subulate, and the stigmas are capitate.

The plant flowers in the summer.

References

Crassulaceae
Plants described in 1841
Taxa named by Johann Friedrich Klotzsch